Patriota is a surname. Notable people with the surname include:

Anchieta Patriota (born 1957), Brazilian politician
Antonio Patriota (born 1954), Brazilian diplomat
Diego Silva Patriota (born 1986), Brazilian footballer
Tania Patriota, Brazilian diplomat